An All-American team is an honorary sports team composed of the best amateur players of a specific season for each team position—which in turn are given the honorific "All-America" and typically referred to as "All-American athletes", or simply "All-Americans". Although the honorees generally do not compete as a unit, the term is used in U.S. team sports to refer to players who national media members select. Walter Camp selected the first All-America team in the early days of American football in 1889. The 2023 NCAA Women's Basketball All-Americans are honorary lists that include All-American selections from the Associated Press (AP), the United States Basketball Writers Association (USBWA), and the Women's Basketball Coaches Association (WBCA) for the 2022–23 NCAA Division I women's basketball season. Both AP and USBWA choose three teams, while WBCA lists ten honorees.

A consensus All-America team in women's basketball has never been organized. This differs from the practice in men's basketball, in which the NCAA uses a combination of selections by AP, USBWA, the National Association of Basketball Coaches (NABC), and Sporting News to determine a consensus All-America team. The selection of a consensus All-America men's basketball team is possible because all four organizations select at least a first and second team, with only the USBWA not selecting a third team.

Before the 2017–18 season, a consensus women's All-America team couldn't be determined because the AP had been the only body that divided its women's selections into separate teams. The USBWA first named different teams in 2017–18. The women's counterpart to the NABC, the Women's Basketball Coaches Association (WBCA), continues the USBWA's former practice of selecting a single 10-member (plus ties) team. Sporting News does not select an All-America team in women's basketball.

By selector

Associated Press (AP) 
Announced on March 15, 2023. The teams are selected by the same 28-member media panel that votes on the AP poll during the season. Of note:
 Aliyah Boston became the tenth player selected as a three-time first-team All-American.
 Boston and Caitlin Clark were unanimous first-team selections.

AP Honorable Mention 
Honorable mention selections are those who did not make one of the first three teams, but received at least one vote from the media panel.

 Georgia Amoore, Virginia Tech
 Brea Beal, South Carolina
 Grace Berger, Indiana
 Leigha Brown, Michigan
 Sonia Citron, Notre Dame
 Makira Cook, Illinois
 Monika Czinano, Iowa

 Rori Harmon, Texas
 McKenna Hofschild, Colorado State
 Jordan Horston, Tennessee
 Rickea Jackson, Tennessee
 Ta'Niya Latson, Florida State
 Charlisse Leger-Walker, Washington State
 Lou Lopez Sénéchal, UConn

 Nika Mühl, UConn
 Charisma Osborne, UCLA
 Celeste Taylor, Duke
 Kaylynne Truong, Gonzaga
 Hailey Van Lith, Louisville
 Keishana Washington, Drexel
 Madi Williams, Oklahoma

United States Basketball Writers Association (USBWA) 
The USBWA announced its 15-member team, divided into first, second, and third teams, plus honorable mention selections, on March 15, 2023. Vote totals were not released.

USBWA Honorable Mention 

 Grace Berger, Indiana
 Rickea Jackson, Tennessee

 Ta'Niya Latson, Florida State
 Hailey Van Lith, Louisville

 Keishana Washington, Drexel

Academic All-Americans
College Sports Communicators (known before the 2022–23 season as the College Sports Information Directors of America) announced its 2022 Academic All-America team on March 16, 2022, divided into first, second, and third teams, with Caitlin Clark of Iowa chosen as women's college basketball Academic All-American of the Year. Due to a tie for the fifth spot on the second team, the overall team had 16 members instead of the usual 15.

References

All-Americans
NCAA Women's Basketball All-Americans